The Right Fork Little Kanawha River is a tributary of the Little Kanawha River,  long, in central West Virginia in the United States.

Upstream of Cleveland the Right Fork collects a tributary named Left Fork Right Fork Little Kanawha River, which flows westward for  through southern Upshur County.

See also
List of rivers of West Virginia

References 

Rivers of West Virginia
Little Kanawha River
Rivers of Braxton County, West Virginia
Rivers of Lewis County, West Virginia
Rivers of Upshur County, West Virginia
Rivers of Webster County, West Virginia